Daria Evgenyevna Dmitrieva (born 9 August 1995) is a Russian female handballer, who plays for RK Krim and Russian national team.

Biography
Daria's father is a former ice hockey player. She trained under Irina Kos at Lada Togliatti, but when the coach decided to leave, Dmitrieva and some of her teammates joined the other Russian handball center in Volgograd. Daria was a 14-year-old when she made that decision in 2009.

Dmitrieva and Anna Vyakhireva were considered the rising stars at the European Junior Championship.

Dmitrieva was voted world's second best young playmaker of the 2013/2014 season by the Handball-Planet.com fans, after Deborah Nunes.

In August 2021, she decided to take a break from her professional handball career, due to exhaustion.

She returned to her club, HBC CSKA Moscow after missing the first half of the season.

Achievements
Russian Super League:
Gold Medalist: 2012, 2013, 2014
EHF Cup Winners' Cup:
Semifinalist: 2012
European Junior Championship:
Gold Medalist: 2013
World Youth Championship:
Silver Medalist: 2012
European Youth Championship:
Gold Medalist: 2011

Individual awards
 All-Star Playmaker of the European Junior Championship: 2013
 All-Star Centre Back of the Summer Olympics: 2016
 Handball-Planet.com World Young Female Handball Player: 2014–15
 Handball-Planet.com World Young Female Playmaker: 2014–15

References

External links
 
 
 
 

1995 births
Living people
Sportspeople from Tolyatti
Russian female handball players
Olympic gold medalists for Russia
Olympic handball players of Russia
Olympic medalists in handball
Handball players at the 2016 Summer Olympics
Handball players at the 2020 Summer Olympics
Medalists at the 2016 Summer Olympics
Medalists at the 2020 Summer Olympics
Olympic silver medalists for the Russian Olympic Committee athletes